Zak Orth (born October 15, 1970) is an American actor known for his roles in Wet Hot American Summer, The Baxter, Melinda and Melinda, In and Out, Music and Lyrics, and NYC 22. He also starred in the NBC television drama Revolution as Aaron, and appeared as a man haunted by psychic visions in an episode of the Fox series Fringe.

Early life and education 
Orth was born Adam Zachary Orth in Libertyville, Illinois, the son of Jane (Oehms), a piano teacher, and Robert Orth, an opera singer. Orth is an alumnus of The Theatre School at DePaul University.

Career 
He is a good friend of the members of the comedy group Stella and has appeared in many of their short films, as well as their 2005 TV series. He is also known for his brief role in Baz Luhrmann's adaptation of Shakespeare's Romeo + Juliet, as the character Gregory. 

He is also one half of The Doilies, a musical comedy group, alongside Michael Showalter.

Filmography

Film

Television

Video games

References

External links

1970 births
Living people
American male film actors
American male television actors
Male actors from Illinois
DePaul University alumni
People from Libertyville, Illinois
20th-century American male actors
21st-century American male actors